Surapata is a mountain in the Vilcanota mountain range in the Andes of Peru, about  high. It is situated in the Puno Region, Melgar Province, Nuñoa District. It lies between Salla Tira in the east and Sambo in the west.

References

Mountains of Peru
Mountains of Puno Region